Boy and Dog in a Johnnypump is a painting created by American artist Jean-Michel Basquiat in 1982. The artwork, which depicts a boy with a dog, is among the most expensive paintings ever purchased. It was purchased for over $100 million in 2020, becoming Basquiat's second most expensive painting following Untitled (1982), which was sold for $110.5 million in 2017.

History
Boy and Dog in a Johnnypump was executed by Jean-Michel Basquiat in 1982, which is considered his landmark year. Reflecting on that period in an interview with The New York Times in 1985, Basquiat said: "I had some money, I made the best paintings ever." Measuring at nearly 14 feet wide and 8 feet high, the painting depicts a skeletal black boy and dog painted in similar style. They're center of the canvas in the spray of an open fire hydrant. A johnny pump is a New York slang term for a fire hydrant that is open in the summer for kids to play in the water. The warm colors suggest a "blazing hot summer landscape."

In June 2020, it was reported that American businessman and art collector Ken Griffin purchased the painting for more than $100 million from American businessman and art collector Peter Brant. Brant's Basquiat collection was exhibited in 2019 at the Brant Foundation in New York. The sale was reportedly finalized before the COVID-19 pandemic earlier that year. A spokesman for Citadel, Griffin's investment firm, released a statement that "the vast majority of Ken's art collection is on display at museums for the public to enjoy. He intends to share this piece as well."

Exhibitions
Ken Griffin, who is a trustee and financial benefactor of the Art Institute of Chicago, loaned Boy and Dog in a Johnnypump to the museum in July 2020.

The painting had previously been exhibited at the following art institutions:

 Jean-Michel Basquiat at Serpentine Gallery in London, March–April 1996.
 Basquiat at Musée d'Art Moderne de la Ville de Paris, October 2010–January 2011; Brant Foundation in New York, March–May 2019.

See also
 List of paintings by Jean-Michel Basquiat
 List of most expensive paintings

References

Paintings by Jean-Michel Basquiat
1982 paintings
Dogs in art
Black people in art
Paintings in the collection of the Art Institute of Chicago